Olivier Bouygues (born 14 September 1950) is deputy CEO of the French company Bouygues, and CEO of the family holding company SCDM.

Early life
He was born on 14 September 1950, and educated at the École Nationale Supérieure du Pétrole et des Moteurs.

Career
In 1974, he joined the Bouygues group, beginning his career in the civil works branch. From 1983-88, he worked at Bouygues Offshore, and held the posts of Director of Boscam, a Cameroon subsidiary, then Director of the France Works and Special Projects division. From 1988-92, he was Chairman and CEO of Maison Bouygues. In 1992, he became Group Executive Vice President of Utilities Management, which grouped the international and French activities of Saur. In 2002, he was appointed Deputy CEO of Bouygues.

He is a director of TF1 Group.

Personal life
He is co-owner of the Château Montrose vineyard, with his brother Martin.

References

External links

1950 births
Living people
Olivier
French billionaires
French businesspeople